Rhyssoplax is a genus of chitons in the family Chitonidae, endemic to Australia, New Zealand, New Caledonia, Norfolk Island, and the Kermadec Islands.

Species
 Rhyssoplax aerea (Reeve, 1847)
 Rhyssoplax aerea aerea (Reeve, 1847)
 Rhyssoplax aerea huttoni (Suter, 1906)
 †Rhyssoplax allanthomsoni Mestayer, 1929
 Rhyssoplax bullocki Sirenko, 2012
 Rhyssoplax canaliculata (Quoy & Gaimard, 1835)
 Rhyssoplax chathamensis (Dell, 1960)
 Rhyssoplax clavata (Suter, 1907)
 Rhyssoplax exasperata Iredale, 1914
 Rhyssoplax kimberi (Ashby, 1929)
 Rhyssoplax komaiana (Is. & Iw. Taki, 1929)
 Rhyssoplax maldivensis (E. A. Smith, 1903)
 Rhyssoplax pulcherrima (Sowerby, 1841)
 Rhyssoplax stangeri (Reeve, 1847)
 Rhyssoplax suteri (Iredale, 1910)
 Rhyssoplax venusta Hull, 1923

Synonyms (?):
 Rhyssoplax baliensis Bullock, 1989: Synonym of Chiton (Rhyssoplax) baliensis (Bullock, 1989)
 Rhyssoplax bednalli (Pilsbry, 1895): Synonym of Chiton (Rhyssoplax) bednalli Pilsbry, 1895
 Rhyssoplax bernardi Ashby, 1931: Synonym of Chiton (Rhyssoplax) barnardi Ashby, 1931
 Rhyssoplax calliozona (Pilsbry, 1894): Synonym of Chiton (Rhyssoplax) calliozonus Pilsbry, 1894
 Rhyssoplax canariensis (d'Orbigny, 1839): Synonym of Chiton (Rhyssoplax) canariensis d'Orbigny, 1839
 Rhyssoplax corallina (Risso, 1826): Synonym of Chiton (Rhyssoplax) corallinus (Risso, 1826)
 Rhyssoplax corphea Hedley & Hull, 1912: Synonym of Chiton (Rhyssoplax) corypheus Hedley & Hull, 1912
 Rhyssoplax coxi Pilsbry, 1894: Synonym of Chiton (Rhyssoplax) coxi Pilsbry, 1894
 Rhyssoplax crawfordi (Sykes, 1899): Synonym of Chiton (Rhyssoplax) crawfordi Sykes, 1899
 Rhyssoplax densilirata Carpenter in Pilsbry, 1893: Synonym of Chiton (Rhyssoplax) densiliratus Carpenter in Pilsbry, 1893
 Rhyssoplax diaphora Iredale & May, 1916: Synonym of Chiton (Rhyssoplax) diaphorus (Iredale & May, 1916)
 Rhyssoplax discolor (Souverbie, 1866): Synonym of Chiton (Rhyssoplax) discolor Souverbie in Souverbie & Montrouzier, 1866
 Rhyssoplax exoptanda (Bednall, 1897: Synonym of Chiton (Rhyssoplax) exoptandus Bednall, 1897
 Rhyssoplax funerea Hedley & Hull, 1912: Synonym of Chiton (Rhyssoplax) funereus Hedley & Hull, 1912
 Rhyssoplax jugosa (Gould, 1846): Synonym of Chiton (Rhyssoplax) jugosus Gould, 1846
 Rhyssoplax kurodai (Taki & Taki, 1929): Synonym of Chiton (Rhyssoplax) kurodai Is. & Iw. Taki, 1929
 Rhyssoplax linsleyi Burghardt, 1973: Synonym of Chiton (Rhyssoplax) linsleyi (Burghardt, 1973)
 Rhyssoplax mauritiana Quoy and Gaimard. 1835: Synonym of Chiton (Rhyssoplax) mauritianus Quoy & Gaimard, 1835
 Rhyssoplax olivacea (Spengler, 1797): Synonym of Chiton (Rhyssoplax) olivaceus Spengler, 1797
 Rhyssoplax orukta Maughan, 1900: Synonym of Chiton (Rhyssoplax) oruktus Maughan, 1900
 Rhyssoplax spinosetatus Bergenhayn, 1930: Synonym of Chiton (Rhyssoplax) subassimilis Souverbie in Souverbie & Montrouzier, 1866
 Rhyssoplax torriana Hedley & Hull, 1910: Synonym of Chiton (Rhyssoplax) torrianus Hedley & Hull, 1910
 Rhyssoplax translucens Hedley & Hull, 1909: Synonym of Chiton (Rhyssoplax) translucens Hedley & Hull, 1909
 Rhyssoplax tricostalis (Pilsbry, 1894): Synonym of Chiton (Rhyssoplax) tricostalis Pilsbry, 1894
 Rhyssoplax tulipa (Quoy & Gaimard, 1835): Synonym of Chiton (Rhyssoplax) politus Spengler, 1797
 Rhyssoplax vaulusensis Hedley & Hull, 1909: Synonym of Chiton (Rhyssoplax) vauclusensis Hedley & Hull, 1909

References
General
 Powell A W B, New Zealand Mollusca, William Collins Publishers Ltd, Auckland, New Zealand 1979 
 Discover life
 CSIRO
 
Citations

Chitonidae
Oligocene genus first appearances
Chiton genera